Anatomy of a Love Song is the seventh studio album by American singer Kenny Lattimore. It was released by Sincere Soul and eOne Music on  April 14, 2015. His debut with the label, the album reached number 10 on the US Independent Albums.

Critical reception

In his review for Allmusic, editor Andy Kellman found that "the singer is at his best when he cooks up modern smooth soul that evokes late-night, late-'70s/early-'80s R&B radio programming; a cover of a ballad written by the likes of Skip Scarborough or Leon Ware could have been inconspicuously slipped into the sequence [...] It sounds as if Lattimore felt absolutely no pressure in delivering his first widely released solo album of original material in 14 years."

Track listing

Notes
  denotes a co-producer

Charts

References 

2015 albums
Kenny Lattimore albums